Presidential elections were held in São Tomé and Príncipe on 30 June 1996. The election was contested by four candidates; incumbent President Miguel Trovoada, former President Manuel Pinto da Costa, Alda Bandeira, a former Foreign Minister, and former Prime Minister Carlos da Graça. No candidate won a majority of votes in the first round, in which voter turnout in the first round was 77.3%, resulting in a second round being held on 21 July between the two leading candidates - Trovoada and da Costa. Trovoada won the election with 52.7% of the vote, based on a 78.7% turnout.

Results

Aftermath
Despite being declared generally free and fair by international and domestic observers, da Costa, who had initially acknowledged Trovoada's victory, contested the results of the election, claiming that irregularities had occurred in the registration process. The National Electoral Commission acknowledged that there were minor discrepancies in the registration process and in voter rolls but determined that these were insufficient to call the results into question.

In early August the Supreme Court declared that it was unable to adjudicate on the appeal made by da Costa, and recommended that the government seek international legal arbitration. However, on 20 August da Costa withdrew his challenge and Trovoada was confirmed as president.

References

Presidential elections in São Tomé and Príncipe
Sao Tome
Presidential election
São Toméan presidential election